Ford Heights School District 169 is a public school district based in Ford Heights, Illinois, United States.

The district is bordered by Joe Orr Road on the north, Stoney Island Avenue to the east, State Street on the west and the Conrail tracks to the south.

Schools
Cottage Grove Upper Grade Center (Grades 5–8)
Medgar Evers Primary Academic Center (Grades PK-4)

High school
Students in grades 9-12 who live within the boundaries of Ford Heights School District 169 attend Bloom Trail High School , operated by Bloom Township High School District 206.

See also
List of school districts in Illinois

References

External links
 

School districts in Cook County, Illinois
Ford Heights, Illinois